Reliance General Insurance Company Limited is an India-based private insurance company and is part of Reliance Anil Dhirubhai Ambani Group, wholly owned through Reliance Capital. As of March 31, 2021, Reliance General Insurance's distribution network is composed of over 129 branches with more than 52,595 intermediaries.

History 
Reliance General Insurance was incorporated on 17 August 2000. It received the license to conduct general insurance business in India from the Insurance Regulatory Development Authority of India (IRDAI) on 23 October 2000. Unlike most insurance companies, who have foreign partners, the firm is promoted solely by Reliance Capital.

Reliance General Insurance is a 100% subsidiary of Reliance Capital Limited a diversified financial services holding company promoted by Reliance Group.

Services 

In travel, Reliance General Insurance provides plans for overseas trips such as Schengen, Asia, and the US. Travel plans tailored for students and senior citizens are also available.

Under Commercial Line Portfolio insurance such as fire, home, indemnity, public, marine, public liability, director’s & officer’s liability, plant & machinery.

The home insurance portfolio covers house contents against theft and damage.

References 

Financial services companies established in 2000
General insurance companies of India
Financial services companies based in Mumbai
2000 establishments in Maharashtra
Indian companies established in 2000